Yonason Sacks is an Orthodox rabbi and the Rosh Yeshiva of Lander College for Men, a division of Touro University, as well as the spiritual leader of the Agudas Yisroel Bircas Yaakov in Passaic, New Jersey.

Family
Sacks' grandfather was one of the leaders of Jewish education in Chicago, Illinois, and his great-grandfather was the Chief Rabbi of Jerusalem, Rabbi Tzvi Pesach Frank.  Sacks dedicated his first book, Chemdas Yomim (focusing on the laws of the Sabbath) in memory of his father.

Sacks lives with his family in Passaic.

Education
Sacks attended the high school headed by Rabbi Shlomo Riskin and Rabbi Pinchas Bak in Riverdale, New York in the mid 1970s.

Sacks graduated from Yeshiva University in 1981 and was ordained by the University's affiliated Rabbi Isaac Elchanan Theological Seminary in 1984.  Two years later, he was awarded yadin yadin semicha.

Rosh Yeshiva
Sacks was rosh yeshiva at Yeshiva University from 1994 until 2012, when he became rosh yeshiva at Beis Midrash L'Talmud, a part of Lander College, a division of Touro University.

Works
Sacks is the author of more than 30 Jewish books, including:
Hagadas Chazon L'Yomim (Hebrew and English)Chazon L'Yomim 1, 2 & 3 on Tractates Pesachim and BeitzahChemdas Yomim on the laws of ShabbosOrchos Yomim on kriyas shema and shmoneh esreiYimei Temimim on Pirkei AvosYimei HaPurim on the holiday of PurimYimei HaSefira on the days of Sefirat Ha'omerYom HaZikaron on the holiday of Rosh HashanahYimei Chanuka on the holiday of ChanukahVihigasa Bo Yomam Valaya'', a three-part series on mitzvos, Torah study, and middos

References

External links
 Articles and audio at torahweb.org
 Biography of Rabbi Yonason Sacks at yutorah.org

Living people
American Orthodox rabbis
Yeshiva University rosh yeshivas
Rabbi Isaac Elchanan Theological Seminary semikhah recipients
People from Passaic, New Jersey
Year of birth missing (living people)